Taiyafeh-ye Seyfollah (also Romanized as Ţāīyafeh-ye Seyfollah) is a village in Howmeh-ye Jonubi Rural District, in the Central District of Eslamabad-e Gharb County, Kermanshah Province, Iran. At the 2006 census, its population was 91, in 24 families.

References 

Populated places in Eslamabad-e Gharb County